Uxue Ezkurdia Álvarez (born 22 January 1994) is a Spanish handballer for Super Amara Bera Bera.

Achievements

Spanish League:
 Winner: 2012/13, 2013/14, 2014/15, 2015/16, 2017/18
 Copa de la Reina de Balonmano:
 Winner: 2012/13, 2013/14, 2015/16
 Runner-up: 2014/15, 2016/17, 2017/18

References 

Living people
1994 births
Spanish female handball players
Sportspeople from San Sebastián
Handball players from the Basque Country (autonomous community)
21st-century Spanish women